Patrick Morrissey may refer to:

Pat Morrissey (Australian footballer) (1891–1938), Australian rules footballer
Patrick Joseph Morrissey (1936–1985), Irish policeman
Pat Morrissey (1948–2005), Irish footballer
Pa Morrissey (born 1981), Irish Gaelic footballer
SS Patrick H. Morrissey, a 1943 liberty ship

See also
Patrick Morrisey (born 1967), American politician